La niña de mis ojos ("The Girl of My Eyes") is a Venezuelan drama telenovela created by Alidha Ávila for RCTV and distributed by Coral Pictures and, RCTV International. It stars Lilibeth Morillo, Simón Pestana, Natalia Streignard and, Juan Pablo Raba.

Plot 
Esteban Olivares (Simón Pestana) is a man condemned to not be happy since he lost his memory and part of his life. María de la Luz Centeno (Lilibeth Morillo) is the apple of her eyes, a recurring image of her lost past and which he ignores, is the mother of her son.

Esteban loved in his adolescence to María de la Luz, but an accident separated them leaving him amnestic. Rosaura, her mother, who does not love her son's girlfriend for being a humble class, takes him to the United States where Esteban finishes his engineering studies.

Meanwhile, María de la Luz, is helpless and pregnant. Without being able to get news of Esteban, María de la Luz has a son Sebastián (Alberto Faría) whom she must raise alone. Alejandro (Juan Pablo Raba), his unconditional friend offers him marriage.

On the day of her wedding, MarÍa de la Luz crosses the church with another couple. This is Esteban and his new girlfriend, the millionaire Isabel (Natalia Streignard) with whom he marries that day. Esteban does not recognize María de la Luz who disillusioned marries Alejandro. Fate will reunite them again, and Esteban will fall in love with María de la Luz without suspecting that it is La niña de mis ojos.

Cast

Starring 
 Lilibeth Morillo as María de la Luz Centeno
 Simón Pestana as Esteban Olivares
 Natalia Streignard as Isabel Díaz Antoni
 Juan Pablo Raba as Alejandro Rondón

Also starring 
 Rosalinda Serfaty as Camila Olivares Sucre
 Hilda Abrahamz as Mercedes Aguirre
 Flavio Caballero as Cristóbal Díaz Antoni
  as Consuelo Landaeta de Olivares
 Carlos Arreaza as Juan Carlos Rondón Ramírez
 Victoria Roberts as Flora Martínez
 Iván Tamayo as Juan Manuel Linares Ponce
 Margarita Hernández as María Delfina Miralles
 Ivette Domínguez as Albertina Ramírez de Rondón
 Gisvel Ascanio as Rosaura Girón
 Marcos Campos as Fernando Garcés
 Alejandro Mata as José Miguel Rondón
 Eric Noriega as Plácido
 Marianela González as Mariana Aguirre
 Óscar Cabrera as Federico
 Susej Vera as Amparo Rotundo
 Yamilé Yordi as Laura Olivares
 Carlos Camacho as Gabriel Fuentes
 Alberto Faría as Sebastián Centeno

Recurring 
 Aileen Celeste as Sandra
 Dora Mazzone as Paula

Special guest stars 
 Hernán Díaz as Himself
 Benjamín Lafont as Himself
 Gonzalo Carré as Himself

References

External links 
 

2001 telenovelas
Spanish-language telenovelas
Venezuelan telenovelas
RCTV telenovelas
2001 Venezuelan television series debuts
2002 Venezuelan television series endings
Television shows set in Venezuela